Neville Gallimore (born January 17, 1997) is a Canadian American football defensive tackle for the Dallas Cowboys of the National Football League (NFL). He played college football at Oklahoma.

Early years
Gallimore's parents were born and raised in Jamaica. He originally attended St. Patrick's High School, where he played defensive tackle. He opted to transfer to the Canada Prep Academy in Welland, Ontario, which allowed him to travel through the United States and compete against some of the top high school football programs.

He was the first Canadian born player to be invited to participate in the U.S. Army All-American Bowl, but couldn’t suit up because of a knee injury in 2015. After receiving 30 scholarship offers from U.S. schools, Gallimore committed to the University of Oklahoma to play college football.

College career
Gallimore redshirted his first year at Oklahoma in 2015. As a freshman in 2016, he played in all 13 games, starting six of the last eight contests, while recording 40 tackles (4 for loss) and one sack.

As a sophomore in 2017, he played in 12 of 14 games, starting the first five contests, before missing 2 due to injury. He tallied 28 tackles (one for loss) and one sack. He had a career-high 9 tackles and half a sack against Tulane University.

As a junior in 2018, he started 13 of 14 games, posting 50 tackles (5 for loss), 3 sacks and 2 forced fumbles. He had 5 tackles in the Big 12 Championship 39–27 win against the University of Texas. He made 8 tackles against the United States Military Academy.

As a senior in 2019, he started 14 games, registering 30 tackles (7.5 for loss), 4 sacks and  2 forced fumbles. He finished his college career with 148 total tackles (18 for loss), 9 sacks, 5 forced fumbles and 3 College Football Playoff appearances.

College statistics

Professional career

Gallimore was selected by the Dallas Cowboys in the third round (82nd overall) of the 2020 NFL Draft. On April 30, he was selected in the eighth (71st overall) and final round of the 2020 CFL Draft by the Saskatchewan Roughriders; he was rated as the #1 Canadian draft prospect for 2020 prior to the NFL and CFL drafts. He was declared inactive in Week 3 and Week 4. He recorded his first NFL tackle in a Week 5 34-37 win over the New York Giants. Even though he played just 20 snaps in the first four contests, he was named the starter at the three-technique defensive tackle position after Gerald McCoy and Trysten Hill were lost for the season with injuries. His best game came in Week 9 against the then-undefeated Pittsburgh Steelers, when he contributed to limit their offense to 46 rushing yards, while making 3 tackles (one for loss) and one quarterback hit. He appeared in 14 games with 9 starts, collecting 26 tackles (4 for loss), 0.5 sacks, 12 quarterback pressures and one pass defended.

On September 2, 2021, Gallimore was placed on injured reserve to start the season. He was activated on December 11 for Week 14.

References

External links
Oklahoma Sooners bio

1997 births
Living people
Canadian football people from Ottawa
Canadian players of American football
Canadian sportspeople of Jamaican descent
American football defensive tackles
Oklahoma Sooners football players
Dallas Cowboys players